Daniel Garbade (born 1957) is a Swiss painter, illustrator, art director, property master, and publisher. Born in Switzerland from Swiss-Cuban origins, Garbade is the grand-nephew of Adrien Lachenal, great-grandchild of Cuban sculptor Fernando Heydrich, grandson of Theodore Garbade and cousin of sculptor Juan Esnard Heydrich.

Garbade lived in Spain from 1983–2011, then taking residence in his hometown Zurich, to work with Peyer Fine Art. In 2016 he returned to Spain, living in Mascaraque, Castile- La Mancha.

Work 
Garbade is one of Spanish expressionists, who turned to Pop art during the Movida madrileña. His stroke is personal and minimalistic. Writer Alvaro Pombo described Garbade's work by coining the term "garbatear". Garbade's portraits are melancholy yet humorous and aim to show mankind at its core. Nobel Prize winner José Saramago once said, "Garbade shows us humanity where it unfolds" His most well-known portraits include those of Nancy Cunard[3], King Juan Carlos I, Rodriguez Zapatero, Kofi Annan and Pedro Almodovar. His image of the naked Pope Benedict XVI attracted attention in 2006 and was removed from his exhibition at the request of the Swiss government.

Poetry 
In 1987, he took part in the publication of poems as co-founder of the Magazine Signos

Sculpture 
On behalf of the Dadaists of the Cabaret Voltaire Zurich, he designed the gravestone of Mikhail Bakunin at the Bremgarten cemetery, Berne. The City of Toledo in Spain invited Garbade to exhibit his sculptures at the Oratorio de San Felipe Neri in 2022.

South America 
Garbade has close ties to South America and Cuba through his family: Garbade's grandmother, Aída, was from Matanzas. Mexico showed his works at the National Museum of Tequila in Jarisco (2021), at the  Museum of the Agave Landscape and Mining (2022) and at the Galerie Kin (1993) in Mexico City. In 2021, Garbade showed his works in the exhibition dedicated to the Bicentennial of the Independence of Peru at the Casa Museo Mario Vargas Llosa in Arequipa (2021). In May 2022, The Ludwig Foundation of Cuba invited the artist to present his works about his origins in Cuba in its Gallery in Havana and in the Visual Arts Center of Matanzas, the Pedro Esquerré Gallery, in two parallel exhibitions.

Film 
Since 1979, Garbade has worked as a production manager and later as Property master for advertising and feature films at Condor Films, Barney, Tardio & Melsky, Warner Bros, TF1 and The Ladd Company. Garbade as had a hand in films such as "Five days one summer" by Fred Zinnemann and "Espion leve toi" by Yves Boisset.

Engagement 
In the book Cosas de casados, which was later turned into an exhibition, he published his drawings on the subject of homosexuality in Art together with David Hockney and Tom of Finland. In 2022, Garbade was invited by the Embassy of Switzerland in India to give a lecture on The Queer in Art and Real Life with Curator Dr.Alka Pande, Saurabh Kirpal, Advocate and LGBTQ+ activist and Vivek Raj Anand, CEO of Humsafar Trust.

His wedding (2006) was the first same-sex marriage in Mascaraque, Castile- La Mancha, Spain

Garbade's exhibition Côctel, with contributions from writers such as Rafael Alberti, Vicente Molina Foix, José Saramago, Jesús Ferrero and Leopoldo Alas, discusses tolerance in the Convent of San Ildefonso (Toledo). The exhibition was supported by the Vice-President of UNESCO and the Swiss Government.

Garbade has been a source of inspiration for intercultural cooperation between Switzerland and Spain since 1983. He brought the first Swiss gallery to the ARCO Art fair in 1985, exhibiting artists like Pablo Runyan or Jorge Arxe. He co-operated with Werner Bischof and John Armleder at the Museo Reina Sofia, Circulo de Bellas Artes and other galleries in the Swiss weeks of Madrid in 1988. In 2012 he was invited to the exhibitions Hispano-Suizo in Zurich, and in 2014 to Hispano -Suizo Madrid. As curator, he conducted the exhibition Desayuno para Inmigrantes on the immigration of Swiss artists in Spain. In 1989, he helped François Lachenal for the exhibition du Greco a Goya, a homage to the works of art from the Museo del Prado saved during the Spanish Civil War in Geneva. His grandfather Paul Lachenal was involved in the safeguard of the paintings as delegate of the International Committee.

Galleries and collections 
 Museo de la Hermandad, Toledo, Spain
 Bienal del Tajo, Toledo, Spain
 Convento of San Ildefonso, Toledo, Spain
 Caja Rural, Retrospectiva, Toledo, Spain
 Gallery Quorum, Madrid, Spain
 , Madrid, Spain
 Gallery Dionis Bennassar, Madrid, Spain
 Peyer Fine Art, Zúrich, Switzerland
 Gallery Ziegler, Zúrich, Switzerland
 ART Basel, Prints, Galeria Barês, Paris, France
 Galería Barês, Paris, France
 Galeria Arthêmes, Burdeos, France
 Galería Knapp, Lausanne, Switzerland
 Tossan Tossan, Gallery, New York, USA
 Gallery Nathan, Zúrich, Switzerland
 Stephen Floersheimer, Orselina, Switzerland
 Gallery Kin, México
Gloria Kirby Collection, Tánger, Morocco
 Kunstszene Luzern, Switzerland
 Caja Rural, Toledo, Retrospectiva, Spain
 Biblioteca Nacional, Madrid, Spain
 Kunstsammlung des Bundes, BAK, Switzerland
 Musee de la ville de Geneve, Switzerland
Metro, Madrid, Spain
Ateneo de Madrid, Spain
Institut des cultures arabes et méditerranéennes, Geneva, Switzerland
Haegeumgang Theme Museum, Geoje-Si, South Korea
Museo Nacional del Tequila, Jalisco, Mexico

Books 
 Alvaro Pombo: Los oleos y dibujos de Garbade. Nicolás Edic., Toledo 1988, 
 Giusepe Ungaretti: Nueve poemas inéditos, Madrid 1990 
 Leopoldo Alas: Signos11/12. Editor Libertarias, Madrid 1991, 
 Daniel Garbade:Encres de chine autor du Fake-book. Knapp,Lausanne 1992,(https://www.worldcat.org/title/daniel-garbade-encres-de-chine-autour-du-fake-book-galerie-knapp-lausanne-16-mai-27-juin-1992/oclc/715285050&referer=brief_results)
 Agustina Bessa Luís:Le Fake-book. Joel Barès, Paris 1992,
 Eduardo Naval, Daniel Garbade:Retrospectiva. Caja Rural, Toledo 1993
 José Saramago, Vicente Molina Foix u.a.: Côctel. El Wisli, Toledo 1996, 
 Daniel Garbade: Pinturas. Editor Miguel Barbaran PI, Madrid 2000, (https://www.worldcat.org/title/daniel-garbade-pinturas-junio-2000-alejandro-arteche-phe00/oclc/795743991&referer=brief_results)
 Daniel Garbade u.a.: Desayuno para Inmigrantes. Ayuntamiento de Madrid, Madrid 2003
 Leopoldo Alas:Hablar desde el trapecio, Editor Libertarias, Madrid 1995, 
 Juan María Crespo: Aprendemos con las letras.Editor McGraw-Hill, Madrid 2002, 
 Michael T. Ganz: La petite mort. El Wisli, Madrid 2006, S. 4–5, 
 José Luís Uriondo: La aventura de las matemáticas.Editor McGraw-Hill, Madrid 2002, 
 José Luís Uriondo: Aprendemos con las matemáticas. Mc Graw Hill, Madrid 2002 
 Beatriz Gimeno: Cosas de Casados.Editor Asociacion Cultural Visible, Madrid 2006, 
 Daniel Garbade: Reload.Editor El Wisli, Madrid 2011, 
 Leopoldo Alas: La loca aventura de vivir,Editor Odisea, Madrid 2009, 
 Sivasailam Thiagarajan:Interaktive Trainingsmethoden ,Editor Wochenschau Verlag, Dr, Kurt Debus GMBH, Schwalbach am Taunus 2014,
 Daniel Garbade:Cut , Editor Artzeitmagazine, Zúrich 2014, 
Daniel Garbade: En cama con Greco y Picasso, Toledo 2018, 
José Infante: Goya on the Beach, Madrid 2019, 
Daniel Garbade: Armas y Almas, Madrid 2019, 
Nuria Delgado: Descends au Sud: Al-Andalus, ICAM Geneva 2020,

References

External links

Gay artists
Living people
1957 births
Swiss illustrators
20th-century Swiss painters
Swiss male painters
Swiss LGBT artists
Swiss contemporary artists
21st-century LGBT people
20th-century Swiss male artists